Rockne Makoa Freitas (born November 23, 1979) is a former American football offensive lineman. He is currently an offensive assistant for the junior varsity football team at Kahuku High School. He is the son of former NFL player Rocky Freitas.

Early years
He attended Kamehameha High School. He earned PrepStar All-America honors, also he was selected to the Western 100 honors from the Tacoma News Tribune. He also was selected to the First-team all-state honors by the Honolulu Star-Bulletin during high school.

College career
He played college football at Arizona. He was honorable mention All-Pac-10 during his tenure at Arizona.

Professional career

Indianapolis Colts
In April 2003, he was selected by the Indianapolis Colts in the 6th round (208th overall) of the 2003 NFL Draft.

Coaching career
Freitas was named the interim head coach for the varsity football team at Kahuku High & Intermediate School in 2017 after head coach Vavae Tata was let go. He led the Red Raiders to an 11–2 record and an OIA championship before losing to Saint Louis in the Open Division title game. Despite his success, he was replaced by the junior varsity head coach, Sterling Carvalho.

Personal life
Freitas is currently a comptroller at Brigham Young University, and is an accountant by trade.

References

External links
Arizona Wildcats bio

1979 births
Living people
Players of American football from Honolulu
American football offensive tackles
Kamehameha Schools alumni
Arizona Wildcats football players
Indianapolis Colts players
High school football coaches in Hawaii